Alex Marshall (born May 7, 1959) is an American journalist who writes and speaks about urban planning, transportation, and political economy.  He is a former Senior Fellow of the Regional Plan Association and contributes to publications concerned with urban design, municipal government, architecture, and related matters — including Metropolis and Governing.

Marshall has authored the books How Cities Work: Suburbs, Sprawl and the Roads Not Taken, Beneath the Metropolis: The Secret Lives of Cities,  and The Surprising Design of Market Economies (Texas 2012).

Background
Marshall was born in Norfolk, Virginia to John Francis Marshall Jr. and Eleanor Jackson Marshall. Marshall's great-grandfather, Albert H. Grandy, founded The Virginian-Pilot newspaper in Norfolk in 1898, and was its first publisher and editor-in-chief.

After attending Woodberry Forest School in the class year of 1978,  Marshall received a dual Bachelor of Science degree in political economy and Spanish from Carnegie Mellon University in 1983 and a master's degree in journalism from Columbia University Graduate School of Journalism in 1988. He studied at the Harvard Graduate School of Design during the 1999–2000 academic year as a Loeb fellow.

Marshall lives with his wife Kristi Barlow in Brooklyn, New York where the couple were noted for their attempt between 2008 and 2010 to organize a cohousing community in Brooklyn.

Career
From 1988 to 1997, Marshall worked as a staff writer and columnist for the Virginian-Pilot, where he came to focus on State and local politics and urban development.  In 1998 and '99, Marshall wrote a bi-weekly opinion column as a correspondent for the Virginian-Pilot.

Marshall left the paper in 1999 for a Loeb Fellowship at the Harvard Graduate School of Design, in Cambridge, Massachusetts.  He moved to New York City shortly thereafter, where he continued his freelance journalism.

Markets and democracy

In his 2012 book The Surprising Design of Market Economies (Texas 2012)and related opinion pieces in  The New York Times, Bloomberg View and other publications, Marshall asserts that government constructs markets in an economic sense. He says the "Free Market" is a false concept that impedes a more active discussion about what kind of markets government builds, which he says in a democracy should be part of regular public discussion. His book takes readers through the construction of property, corporations, patents and physical infrastructure, all of which Marshall views as the foundations for markets.

The book and its ideas aroused opposition from those who view markets as existing outside government. On Sept 14, 2012, Nick Sorrentino, in his blog AgainstCronyCapitalism.org, described Marshall's ideas in a Bloomberg View essay the previous day as "nonsense."

"Markets are as natural as a dawn in the desert," said Sorrentino.  "And like all of these things they do not need government to exist."

Marshall's ideas have received support from other quarters. Challenge Magazine, a journal edited by Jeffrey Madrick and whose editorial board includes Paul Krugman and Robert Solow, had an article by Marshall summarizing the book's ideas in its March/April 2014 issue.

Controversy over New Urbanism
In the 1990s, Marshall became involved in controversy over his criticism of New Urbanism, a school of suburban design he called a marketing scheme to repackage conventional suburban sprawl behind nostalgic imagery and aspirational sloganism.

In a 1995 article in Metropolis Magazine, Marshall denounced New Urbanism as "a grand fraud".  Marshall continued the theme in numerous articles, including an opinion column in the Washington Post in September of the same year, and in Marshall's first book, How Cities Work:  Suburbs, Sprawl, and the Roads Not Taken (Austin: U. of Texas Press 2000).

Andrés Duany, the architect whose Duany Plater Zyberk & Company is among the leading promoters of New Urbanism, and some of whose projects had come under Marshall's strongest criticism, dismissed Marshall's criticisms in an interview for the Daily Princetonian, saying that Marshall, ". . . cannot stand the fact that we're working with the middle class. He wants us to spend all our time with the poor."

New-Urbanism advocate James Howard Kunstler gave Marshall negative reviews of How Cities Work, in Metropolis Magazine.  Kunstler wrote, 

He concluded 

Architectural Record called How Cities Work an "important new work," saying

Books
 The Surprising Design of Market Economies (University of Texas Press, 2012), 
 Beneath The Metropolis: the Secret Lives of Cities (Carroll and Graf, 2006), 
 How Cities Work: Suburbs, Sprawl and The Roads Not Taken (University of Texas Press, 2001),

References

External links
 Alex Marshall's web site
 Laura Granieri, "12 Years Later, How Cities Work is Still a Must-Read", web log entry, The Grid, Nov 26, 2013.
 Tom Weber, interview with Alex Marshall, The Daily Circuit, Minnesota Public Radio, Oct 23, 2013.
 Cathy Lewis, interview with Alex Marshall, HearSay, WHRV, Norfolk, Va., September 17, 2013.
 Mary Manning Cleveland (Adjunct Professor of Environmental Economics, Columbia University), review of The Surprising Design of Market Economies, Huffington Post, June 14, 2013.
 Sam Roberts, review of The Surprising Design of Market Economies, "Bookshelf", The New York Times, February 22, 2013.
 Steve Scher, interview with Alex Marshall, KUOW, Seattle, Wash., January 29, 2013. Interview begins at 20:30.
 Allison Arieff, "What Jane Jacobs Got Wrong About Urban Economies", The Atlantic Cities, December 5, 2012.  Interview with Alex Marshall.
 Serena Dai, Five Best Friday Columns, The Atlantic Wire , September 14, 2012.
 The Surprising Design of Market Economies at University of Texas Press
 How Cities Work at University of Texas Press
 NewUrbanism.org, a web site advocating New Urbanism, passenger rail, and related causes.

1959 births
Writers from Norfolk, Virginia
Living people
American male journalists
Journalists from Virginia